Polish rock refers to rock music from Poland.

1960s
After the era of "big-bit" (Polish style of simple rock'n'roll), one of the earliest pioneers of Polish rock was Tadeusz Nalepa, a singer, guitarist and songwriter who began his career playing pop music in his group - Blackout, before turning to blues rock and changing the band's name to Breakout in 1968. Their debut - "Na drugim brzegu tęczy", is often referred to as the "first Polish rock album in history".

Significant artists of the "big-bit era" include: Czerwone Gitary, Niebiesko-Czarni, Czerwono-Czarni, Trubadurzy, Karin Stanek.

1970s

In the 1970s, due to political pressure and censorship, there were very few bands that managed to gain commercial success or become artistically notable.

Significant 1970s artists include: Niemen, Budka Suflera, SBB, Marek Grechuta (artist on the edge of rock, usually not of that genre), Skaldowie. Breakout recorded and released their most successful album, Blues in 1971.
Among these bands, who achieved local success, but never managed to gain international recognition despite their quality, were Grupa Stress and Nurt, which were more on the hard-rock psychedelic, progressive side.

1980s

1982 - beginning of the "boom of rock" in Poland - debuts or first success of many important bands. On 24.04.1982 was first broadcast of Lista Przebojów Programu Trzeciego, voting chart that helped promoting many rock bands. Underground artists were promoted at Rozgłośnia Harcerska.

1987-1990 - crisis of rock, many artists emigrated, bands broke up, split or were suspended. Meanwhile, there was second wave of Polish rock called Krajowa Scena Młodzieżowa (Sztywny Pal Azji, Chłopcy z Placu Broni, Róże Europy, Kobranocka, Tilt, Mr. Zoob, Rezerwat), but with minor market and/or artistic success.

Significant 1980s artists

- official market: "THE GREAT FOUR": Perfect, Republika, Lady Pank, Maanam. Other: Oddział Zamknięty, Lombard, TSA, Bajm (most of them still active and popular in the 2000s)

- underground scene: Kult, Dezerter, Brygada Kryzys, Klaus Mitffoch, Dżem, T.Love Alternative, Turbo, Aya RL, Izrael, Daab, Kat, Lessdress (debuted in 1989)

1990s

1992-1995 - second boom of Polish rock, many female vocalists

From 1997 till the mid-2000s Polish rock "went underground" due to not being played on greatest commercial medias, despite many artistic successes or attention of many fans.

significant 1990s artists: Wilki, Myslovitz, Acid Drinkers, Homo Twist, Vader, Voo Voo, Armia, Sweet Noise, Kazik/Kazik Na Żywo, Ira

female rock: Hey, Edyta Bartosiewicz, Kasia Kowalska, O.N.A., Closterkeller

gained new success: Kult, Dżem, T.Love (after changing style from punk to rock shortened its name from T.Love Alternative)

reunioned and managed to gain new fans: Perfect, Republika, Lady Pank, Maanam

2000s

Significant 2000s artists: Myslovitz, Kult, Hey, Dżem, Wilki, Cool Kids of Death, Coma, Lao Che, Pogodno, Ścianka, Vader, Behemoth, Voo Voo, Lech Janerka, Strachy na Lachy, Krzysztof Wałecki ( solo and with Vintage), Darek Pietrzak, Acid Drinkers and Riverside.

Poland has a very active underground extreme metal Music Scene. Some of the bands that have heralded and helped the cause are Vader, Behemoth, Yattering, Decapitated and Lux Occulta. This has paved ground for a large underground movement. One of the biggest death metal record labels in Poland is Metal Mind Records.

External links
 http://www.warsawvoice.pl/archiwum.phtml/8398/
 http://www.warsawvoice.pl/view/12740
 http://www.paulwertico.com/biography/sbb.php
 http://www.archiwumrocka.art.pl/

References
 Leszek Gnoiński, Jan Skaradziński. "Encyklopedia polskiego rocka", In Rock, 2006
 Marek Niedźwiecki. "Lista przebojów", Wydawnictwo Wacław Bagiński, Wrocław 2006
 Marek Niedźwiecki. "Lista przebojów Trójki 1994-2006", Prószyński i s-ka, 2006

Polish music
Poland